The Man and the Girl at the Underground Mansion (Danish: Karlen og pigen i den underjordiske herregård) is a Danish folktale collected by theologue Nikolaj Christensen in the 19th century, but published in the 20th century by Danish folklorist Laurits Bodker.

It is related to the cycle of the Animal as Bridegroom and distantly related to the Graeco-Roman myth of Cupid and Psyche, in that the heroine is forced to perform difficult tasks for a witch.

Summary
A man and a girl work at a farm. The man gifts the girl a black ribbon, which is stolen by a fox. The man goes after the fox and ends up at a country mansion. The girl hangs some clothes on the hanger at the farm, which are snatched by the same fox. The girl chases after the animal and arrives at the same mansion. The girl becomes a servant and is made to unload a dung heap and to wash a black cloth white as part of her tasks.

A man offers to help her in exchange for becoming the girl's sweetheart. The girl declines his offer, but the man helps her anyway: he strikes the dung heap and the cloth with a red wand. Next, the girl learns the man is set to be married to the farmer's daughter, and the girl is ordered to get jewels for the upcoming wedding. The man warns her that the jewel box belongs to a witch, and on the way there, she must fix a broken plank of a bridge, milk a cow, give water to a bull, shake a tree, enter the witch's house and accept the food she will offer (a milk bowl), but give it to the dog. The girl follows the instructions to the letter and gets the jewel box from the witch. The girl escapes, despite the witch commanding the dog, the cow, the bull, the tree and the bridge to stop her. At a safe distance, the girl opens the box and a bird flies out of it. The man appears to her, beats the box with the wand, and the bird flies back into it.

Lastly, the girl is set to hold a torch near the married couple. The girl holds the torch until it nearly burns her fingers, but the man puts the torch out and, in the dark, kills his bride and her mother. He marries the girl and they live in the mansion.

Analysis

Tale type
The tale is classified in the international Aarne-Thompson-Uther Index as tale type AaTh 428, "The Wolf": the heroine works for a witch and is forced to perform impossible tasks (such as washing a black object white and vice-versa), but she prevails with the aid of a wolf. One of the heroine's tasks is to go to another witch (the first witch's sister) and get from her a box with songs or a bridal dowry for the first witch. In some variants, the heroine is sent with a letter to a second witch, who is to get the letter and kill the heroine.

According to Danish scholar Inger Margrethe Boberg, the heroine's helper in type 428 may be a young man cursed to be an animal in Northern Europe, while in variants from Southern Europe her helper is the witch's own son, who falls in love with the heroine.

However, tale type AaTh 428 is considered by scholars as a fragmentary version of the tale of Cupid and Psyche, lacking the initial part about the animal husband and corresponding to the part of the witch's tasks. Accordingly, German folklorist Hans-Jörg Uther revised the international classification system and subsumed previous type AaTh 428, "The Wolf", under the new type ATU 425B, "Son of the Witch".

Variants
The second revision of the folktale index, published in 1961 by Stith Thompson, located variants in Denmark, Sweden, Finland and among the Finnish-Swedish. Thompson and Swedish scholar  listed variants of the type in Italy, Spain, Portugal, Norway, Iceland and Russia.

Denmark
After his mother dies, his father remarries, but Jens Peter's stepmother, a witch, turns him into a poodle hound. One day, a girl comes to work for the stepmother, and she orders her to milk four she-goats, then to winnow a pile of grains with a bottomless sieve, and finally to go to the witch's sister's house in a remote farm and ask for bread. The poodle hound helps the girl in all tasks, with the condition that the girl gives him three kisses and calls him "rosenmund" ("rosy-mouth"). They also throw the witch stepmother in an oven and kill her. At the end of the tale, the girl decapitates the dog, as per his request, and turns him back to Jens Peter.

Danish scholars Axel Olrik and Inger Margrethe Boberg summarized a Danish tale collected by philologist Ida Falbe-Hansen from Funen, with the title Lille Per og lille Maren ("Little Per and Little Maren"). In this tale, the titular Per and Maren follow a ball to a hill-woman's lair, and work for her. Maren is forced to wash a piece of black wool white, then black again. Per helps her in this first task. Next, Maren is tasked with cleaning heaps of dung. Thirdly, she is ordered by the witch to go to the witch's sister's house and fetch ballads for the witch's daughter's wedding. Per intercepts Maren before she travels to Hell, and advises her: Maren is to oil gate hinges, shake a pear tree, turn loaves of bread inside an oven, milk a cow and give ladles to servants and groats to chicken. While in Hell, she must not eat anything, get the ballads and escape. Maren follows his warnings and walks out of Hell with a basket with ballads, but she peeps into the basket and the ballads fly out of it. Per appears and brings them back into the basket. Lastly, Maren is made to hold candles next to the witch's daughter and Per, but the boy asks the bride to trade places with Maren and hold them. The candles burn the witch's daughter. Per and Maren kill the witch, the lair becomes a castle and they live there.

Sweden
Waldemar Liungman named tale type 428 in Sweden as Der musizierende Schrein oder Der Auftrag bei der Schwester der Hexe ("The Music-playing Wooden Box or the Orders from the Witch's Sister").

In a tale collected by G. A. Åberg from Strömfors with the title Te trölla prinsn, a girl finds work with an old woman. The first task is to wash black wool white. The girl cries over the impossibility, until a wolf appears to her with a magic wand. With the wolf's help, the girl accomplishes the task. The old woman, then, orders her to wash the white wool back into black. As the third task, the old woman gives the girl a letter and orders her to deliver it to her sister, who lives across the lake. The wolf gives another magic wand to the girl to create a dry passageway across the lake, and bread, firewood and two breadspades. The girl walks to the old woman's sister and gives the bread to two oxen, throws the firewood in a bonfire and gives the breadspade to two women by a stove. The girl gives the letter to the old woman's sister, who invites her in to eat some sausages. The girl accepts the food, but hides it in her clothing to trick the old woman. At the end of the tale, the girl disenchants the her wolf helper, who was a prince under a curse.

August Bondeson collected a Swedish tale titled Svarte Joder ("Black Joder"): a poor old man is starving on Christmas Eve, and loudly declares he wishes to trade his daughter Inga for a cake. Suddenly, the door opens and a person offers the man a cake, in exchange for Inga. So a deal is made, and the person takes Inga with him. The man lives with Inga, but only appears at night. Inga's father pays her a visit and asks her about her mysterious husband. After listening to his daughter's tale, the man suggests Inga takes a light to her bed at night to better see her husband. Inga takes a candle to her bed and spies on the man asleep beside her: he is a handsome man. A drop of wax falls on him and he wakes up, lamenting to Inga that a witch cursed him into another form unless he married her daughter, but now they must go to the witch's house. Inga takes service with the witch, who, before she leaves, orders the girl to wash black clothes white. However, as much as Inga tries to wash them, the clothes keep getting blacker. A man named Svarte Joder offers his help, if she calls him her friend. Inga declines his offers, but Svarte Joder helps her in the task. Next, the witch orders Inga to grind groats. Thirdly, the witch is preparing her daughter's wedding, and orders Inga to go to the witch's sister (also a sorceress) to get a box, and the girl must not look inside. Svarte Joder intercepts Inga and warns her not to eat anything in the sorceress's house. The girl goes there and is offered a calf's foot, which she hides in her clothing. Inga gets the box and leaves the house. On the road, Inga opens up the box and its contents fly over to a nearby treetop. Svarte Joder appears and places the contents back into the box. Lastly, the witch marries her daughter to Svarte Joder (back to human form), and forces Inga to hold torches in her hands for the whole night, hoping the torches will burn her. Svarte Joder approaches Inga and offers to release her from the task if she says she wants him to be her friend. Inga agrees and trades places with the witch's daughter, so that she, and not Inga, is burned by the torches. It happens so. The next morning, the witch goes to check on Svarte Joder, and, seeing that Inga is on the bed, and her daughter burned to ashes, explodes in anger.

Iceland
Icelandic scholar Einar Ólafur Sveinsson located an Icelandic tale published by author Jon Árnáson, which he related to Cupid and Psyche, but supposed it was a combination of fragments of different stories. In this tale, a girl named Helga loses her favorite cow Bukolla, and looks for her in the mountains. She does not find it, but meets a troll witch, for whom she is forced to perform difficult tasks. The girl is helped by an ugly person called Dordingull, and the last task is for her to go to the Queen of the Dales (a character that Sveinsson considered to be a local and demythified Persephone). The vile ogress sends Helga to the Queen of the Dales or Dale-queen (Icelandic: Daladrottning) to get a brooch she left there and a game of chess. Dordingull advises her to sit at the Dale-queen's table, make the sign of the cross to bless the tableware and eat not of the food the Queen offers, but to hide some portions in her clothes.

Finland
Finnish folklorist Antti Aarne listed 6 variants of type 428 in Finland, five of them in manuscript versions.

Latvia 
According to the Latvian Folktale Catalogue, a similar story is found in Latvia, indexed as its own Latvian type *438, Suns — līgavainis ("The Dog Bridegroom"), but in its second redaction: a dog appears to the heroine and helps her wash black wool into white; later, when the heroine is tasked with going to another witch, the dog advises her not to eat any food while at the witch's house.

Italy 
Italian author  collected a tale from Firenze with the title Le Due Belle-Gioje, which was translated by author Marc Monnier as Les Deux Mignon-Bijou. In this tale, a queen consults with an astrologer, who warns that her unborn child, the princess, will be taken by the wind. Fearing the prediction, as soon as the princess is born, she is placed and raised in a tower. One day, when she is old enough, the king, has father, consults with his ministers the next step to protect her, and they suggest he builds an iron carriage for her. Despite every measure of protection, while the princess is in her carriage, a strong gust of wind blows her away to an island where a fairy woman lives. She introduces herself as a princess, and the fairy, in a mocking tone, dismisses any notions of royalty, and tells the girl she has to earn her bread by working for her. At ten o'clock in the evening, the fairy gives the princess a meagre meal, while explaining the situation to her son, also named Bella-Gioja, just as the princess. The fairy's son visits the princess and tells her he would never mock her name, and advises her that his mother will force her to do things she will never be able to fulfill, so, at 11 o'clock in the evening, he will come and do it for her. This happens for the next two nights. On the third night, Bella-Gioja and the fairy's son escape with a magic ring from his mother. Back home, the fairy, noticing his son's tardiness, goes to check on him and sees his empty bedroom, then goes after the pair. She passes by a garden-keeper selling his vegetables, then a tailor selling fabric, and a priest and a church, and none of them know of the pair. Soon after, Bella-Gioja and the fairy's son realize the fairy is on their trail, and Bella-Gioja uses the magic ring to create behind them a forest, then a mountain, and finallly a field of pointy needles that destroy the fairy. At last, the princess and the fairy's son reach her homeland, where they create a palace with the magic ring. The next day, the king sees the newly built palace and goes there with two pages to meet the lord of the castle. The fairy's son appears to him and introduces himself as Bella-Gioja, also the name of the king's daughter. Princess Bella-Gioja is beside her beloved, the fairy's son, and tells her father the fairy forced her on difficult tasks: on the first day, she had to separate a heap of green beans, white beans and corn; on the second day, she had to gather all the clothes, mend, sew, wash, dry and iron them - both tasks done with the fairy's son help. The king is happy for his daughter's safe return and marries her to the fairy's son. Swedish scholar  considered the tale as a variant of type 428.

See also
 The Tale about Baba-Yaga (Russian fairy tale)
 The Little Girl Sold with the Pears
 La Fada Morgana (Catalan folk tale)
 Prunella (fairy tale)

References 

Danish fairy tales
Fiction about shapeshifting
Female characters in fairy tales
ATU 400-459